Miglena Georgieva Selishka (born 13 February 1996) is a Bulgarian freestyle wrestler. At the 2020 European Wrestling Championships held in Rome, Italy, she won the gold medal in the women's 50 kg event. She also won the silver medal in this event in 2019, 2021 and 2022. She also competed in the women's 50 kg event at the 2020 Summer Olympics held in Tokyo, Japan.

Career 

She won the gold medal in the 44 kg event at the 2013 European Juniors Wrestling Championships held in Skopje, North Macedonia. She repeated this a year later at the 2014 European Juniors Wrestling Championships held in Warsaw, Poland. She also won one of the bronze medals in her event at the 2014 World Junior Wrestling Championships held in Zagreb, Croatia. In 2015, she won the gold medal in her event at the European Juniors Wrestling Championships held in Istanbul, Turkey. In 2016, she won one of the bronze medals in the 48 kg event at the World Junior Wrestling Championships held in Mâcon, France.

In 2017, she won one of the bronze medals in the 48 kg event at the Golden Grand Prix Ivan Yarygin held in Krasnoyarsk, Russia. In that same year, she also competed in the 48 kg event at the 2017 European Wrestling Championships in Novi Sad, Serbia where she was eliminated in her first match by Milana Dadasheva. Later that year, she competed in the 48 kg event at the 2017 World Wrestling Championships without winning a medal. She was eliminated in her second match by Jasmine Mian of Canada.

She won the silver medal in the women's 50 kg at the 2019 European Wrestling Championships held in Bucharest, Romania. In that same year, she represented Bulgaria at the 2019 World Beach Games in Doha, Qatar and she won the silver medal in the women's 50 kg event. In 2020, she won one of the bronze medals in the women's 50 kg event at the Individual Wrestling World Cup held in Belgrade, Serbia.

In March 2021, she won the silver medal in the 50 kg event at the Matteo Pellicone Ranking Series held in Rome, Italy. In the same month, she also qualified at the European Qualification Tournament to compete at the 2020 Summer Olympics in Tokyo, Japan. In April 2021, she won the silver medal in the 50 kg event at the European Wrestling Championships held in Warsaw, Poland. In October 2021, she competed in the women's 50 kg event at the World Wrestling Championships held in Oslo, Norway.

In February 2022, she won the gold medal in the 50 kg event at the Dan Kolov & Nikola Petrov Tournament held in Veliko Tarnovo, Bulgaria. In that same month, she also won one of the bronze medals in her event at the Yasar Dogu Tournament held in Istanbul, Turkey. In March 2022, she won the silver medal in the 50 kg event at the European Wrestling Championships held in Budapest, Hungary. In September 2022, she competed in the 50kg event at the World Wrestling Championships held in Belgrade, Serbia.

Achievements

References

External links 
 

Living people
1996 births
People from Dupnitsa
Bulgarian female sport wrestlers
Wrestlers at the 2019 European Games
European Games bronze medalists for Bulgaria
European Games medalists in wrestling
European Wrestling Championships medalists
Wrestlers at the 2020 Summer Olympics
Olympic wrestlers of Bulgaria
European Wrestling Champions
Sportspeople from Kyustendil Province
21st-century Bulgarian women